Kiichiro Toyama (22 November 1909 – 15 September 1999) was a Japanese gymnast. He competed in eight events at the 1936 Summer Olympics.

References

External links
 

1909 births
1999 deaths
Japanese male artistic gymnasts
Olympic gymnasts of Japan
Gymnasts at the 1936 Summer Olympics
Place of birth missing
20th-century Japanese people